Edwin Newton "Ted" Snitjer (September 30, 1878 – January 31, 1948) was an American football player and coach. He served as the head football coach at the Carnegie Institute of Technology—now known as Carnegie Mellon University—for one season, in 1909, compiling a record of 5–3–1. Snitjer attended Yale University, where played football for the 1899 Yale Bulldogs football team as an end before graduating in 1900. He coached at Allegheny Prep and then was an assistant coach at Carnegie Tech in 1908 under William F. Knox. In 1916, Snitjer joined the coaching staff at Saint Mary's College of California to assist head football coach David C. MacAndrew.

Snitjer died on January 31, 1948, in Los Angeles, California, following a heart attack.

Head coaching record

College

References

External links
 

1878 births
1948 deaths
19th-century players of American football
Carnegie Mellon Tartans football coaches
Saint Mary's Gaels football coaches
Yale Bulldogs football players
High school football coaches in Pennsylvania
Players of American football from St. Louis